Anapronoe is a genus of crustaceans belonging to the monotypic family Anapronoidae.

The species of this genus are found in the Central Atlantic Ocean.

Species:

Anapronoe bowmani 
Anapronoe reinhardti

References

Amphipoda